Yang Teramat Mulia Tunku Syed Razman ibni al-Marhum Tunku Syed 'Idrus al-Qadri (born 14 December 1962 in Seremban) is a Malaysian royal and the current hereditary ruler, titled Tunku Besar, of Tampin, in Negeri Sembilan. He is the only son of the previous ruler, Tunku Syed Idrus al-Qadri, and his wife Tunku Zainon binti Tunku Sulaiman. He was declared the heir apparent to the princedom of Tampin at birth. He succeeded on the death of his father on 26 December 2005.

Tunku Razman was formally installed as Tunku Besar at Belai Rasmi, in Tampin, on 12 August 2006.

He is the patron of the Tunku Syed Razman Environmental Foundation, established in 2010.

References 

1962 births
Living people
Malaysian people of Yemeni descent
People from Negeri Sembilan
Malaysian royalty